The 2016 EHF European Wheelchair Handball Nations’ Tournament was the 2nd edition and was hosted for the first time in Sweden from 7 to 8 December 2016.

Venues

Match officials

Preliminary round
''All times are local (UTC+1)

Knockout stage

Third place game

Final

Ranking and statistics

Final ranking

All-Star Team
The all-star team and awards were announced on 8 December 2016.

Awards

Top goalscorers

References

External links
website
old website (archived)

2016
European Wheelchair Handball Nations’ Tournament
European Wheelchair Handball Nations’ Tournament
European Wheelchair Handball Nations’ Tournament
International handball competitions hosted by Sweden
European Wheelchair Handball Nations’ Tournament
Sport in Blekinge County